Nomarhia (literally Prefectural Administration) is an under-construction metro station serving Thessaloniki Metro's Line 2. The station is named after the nearby Villa Allatini, which housed the administrative headquarters of the Prefecture of Thessaloniki (Nomarhia Thessalonikis). Prefectures were abolished in 2010 and the Villa now houses the regional administration of Central Macedonia, but the station name has remained. It is expected to enter service in 2023.

References

See also
List of Thessaloniki Metro stations

Thessaloniki Metro